Wicked Wayz is the debut solo studio album by American rapper Mr. Mike. It was released on July 30, 1996 through Suave House/Relativity Records. Production was handled by Smoke One Productions, E-A-Ski & CMT, with Tony Draper serving as executive producer. It features guest appearances from 8Ball & MJG, Christión, E-A-Ski, Ice Cube, N.O.L.A. and O.C. The album peaked at number 29 on the Billboard 200 and number 5 on the Top R&B/Hip-Hop Albums chart. Its lead single, "Where Ya Love At?", reached #87 on the Hot R&B/Hip-Hop Songs and #40 on the Hot Rap Songs.

Track listing

Charts

References

Mr. Mike albums
1996 debut albums
Relativity Records albums
Albums produced by E-A-Ski